Epidemic polyarthritis is an outdated term that was formerly used to refer to polyarthritis caused by two mosquito-borne viruses endemic to Australasia:
 Barmah Forest virus, which causes Barmah Forest Fever
 Ross River virus (RRV), which causes Ross River Fever

References

Arthritis
Animal viral diseases